Ahmad al-Sayyed is a Syrian politician. As minister of justice, he is a member of the Cabinet of Syria.

Political career
He was appointed minister of justice in the First Hussein Arnous government in 2020. In 2021 he was reappointed to the role in the Second Hussein Arnous government.

He has carried out an agenda of judicial reform.

References

Living people
21st-century Syrian politicians
Syrian ministers of justice
Arab Socialist Ba'ath Party – Syria Region politicians
Syrian jurists
1965 births